The Bodo Sahitya Sabha promotes the Bodo language and Bodo literature.

It was founded under the presidency and leadership of Joy Bhadra Hagjer, at Basugaon, in the district of Kokrajhar, Assam on 16 November 1952. It consisted of representatives of Assam, West Bengal, Meghalaya, Nagaland, Tripura and Nepal in abroad.

Early work 
After India obtained independence, a critical mass of Bodo intellectuals realized the need for preservation of Bodo language. Many early Bodo authors studied in schools and colleges, where medium of instruction was either Assamese or Bengali. Bodo intellectuals felt that Bodo language must be preserved and developed at par with Assamese and Bengali languages. Bodo people realized very late that the education was the key component to the overall development of Bodo people and their language. After prolonged struggle and determination of the Bodo Sahitya Sabha (Bodo Literary Organization), the Bodo language was introduced as a medium of instruction at primary level in 1963 and then at secondary level in 1968. Bodo language and literature has been recognized as one of the Major Indian Languages (MIL) in Gauhati, Dibrugarh and  North-Eastern Hill Universities. In 2004, Bodo has been recognized as an associated state official language of Assam.

Bodo Sahitya Sabha celebration
The 58th Annual Conference of Bodo Sahitya Sabha commenced with a three day long programme at Daimalu High School playground, Gohpur in Biswanath district of Assam on 22 January 2019.

Recent development 
Now the language has attained a position of pride with the opening of the Post-Graduate Courses in Bodo language and literature in the University of Gauhati in 1996 and in Bodoland University, Kokrajhar. Moreover, under the aegis of the commission for Scientific and Technical terminology, HRD Ministry, the Govt. of India, the Bodo Sahitya Sabha is preparing more than forty thousand scientific and technical terms in Bodo language. Further, it is promised, the Sahitya Academy would accord "Bhasa Sonman"(respect for language) to the Bodo language and literature as an initial token of full-fledged recognition to it. Furthermore, the Govt. of India, in principle, has recognized the necessity of inclusion of the Bodo language and literature in the Eighth Schedule of the Constitution of India.

Contributions 
Moreover, the Bodo Sahitya Sabha has to its credit a large number of books on prose, poetry, drama, short story, novel, biography, travelogue, children's literature & criticism.

Presidents

See also 
 Bodo people
 Bodo language
 Asom Sahitya Sabha
 Manipuri Sahitya Parishad
 Bodoland

References

External links 
 Bodo Sahitya Sabha
 Presidents of Bodo Sahitya Sabha
 Discover Bodoland
 Bodopress News
About BSS

Culture of Assam
Bodo
Indic literature societies